Syla is a surname. Notable people with the surname include:

Alberina Syla (born 1997), German-born Kosovan footballer
Brilant Syla (born 1991), Albanian footballer
Korab Syla (born 1992), Albanian-born American footballer
Liridona Syla (born 1986), Kosovan footballer

See also
Deities of Slavic religion